Johnson bar is the term for several different hand-operated levers used in vehicles. Their distinguishing feature is a positive latch, typically spring-loaded, to hold the lever in a selected position, capable of being operated with one hand.  Some Johnson bars have a fully ratcheting mechanism, some just a series of detents, and others yet simply engaged and disengaged positions.

A common example is the Johnson bar-controlled parking brake found on many trucks and buses. 

Many steam locomotives have valve gear controls which are set using a railroad-specific Johnson bar. 

The forward/reverse lever on Caterpillar tractors is also called a Johnson bar.

Some light general aviation aircraft (including Piper Cherokees, Beech Musketeers, and some early model Cessnas – such as the Cessna 140) - use Johnson bars to actuate flaps and wheel brakes. The Cessna 162 Skycatcher uses a Johnson bar for flap operation. A small number of older aircraft (including the Mooney M-18, some older M20s and some Progressive Aerodyne SeaReys) also have landing gear actuated by Johnson bars.
The Boeing 707/720 aircraft had a Johnson bar for manually extending the nose landing gear, in case the normal gear extension failed.

See also 

 Cutoff
 Reversing lever

References 

Vehicle design
Vehicle parts